Leri Gogoladze, also known as Larry Gogoladze, (born 1 April 1938) is a retired Georgian water polo goalkeeper who competed for the Soviet Union in the 1960 Summer Olympics; he played three matches and won a silver medal.

Around mid-1960s Gogoladze retired from sports to focus on his doctorate in mathematics. He later became a professor of mathematics and a vice-rector of the Tbilisi State University.

See also
 Soviet Union men's Olympic water polo team records and statistics
 List of Olympic medalists in water polo (men)
 List of men's Olympic water polo tournament goalkeepers

References

External links
 

1938 births
Living people
Sportspeople from Tbilisi
Male water polo players from Georgia (country)
Soviet male water polo players
Water polo goalkeepers
Olympic water polo players of the Soviet Union
Water polo players at the 1960 Summer Olympics
Olympic silver medalists for the Soviet Union
Olympic medalists in water polo
Medalists at the 1960 Summer Olympics